Rushworth is a surname of  English origin and may refer to:
 Harold Rushworth (1880–1950), New Zealand politician; MP for Bay of Islands 1929–38
 John Rushworth (1612–1690), English historian
 Lee Rushworth (born 1982), English cricketer
 Robert A. Rushworth (1924–1993), American test pilot in the X-15 program
 Val Rushworth (contemporary), British road and track racing cyclist
 Verity Rushworth (born 1985), English television actress

As a given name
 Rushworth Kidder (1944–2012), American philosopher and author

See also
 Rushworth, Victoria
 Rushworth and Dreaper, English organ-makers